Engebret Café is a restaurant located at Bankplassen 1 in downtown Oslo, Norway. The food is based on exclusive (but expensive) Norwegian cuisine.  The building housing the cafe dates from around 1760 and is listed and protected by law by the Norwegian Directorate for Cultural Heritage.

History 
Engebret Café is the oldest restaurant in continuous operation in Oslo. The restaurant is named after its founder Engebret Christoffersen, who started the restaurant in 1848. The restaurant was at first located in Rådhusgata 11, but has stayed at the square Bankplassen since 1863.

Engebret Café has during the time it has existed, undergone very few changes. In 1921 it was hit by fire. A year later it opened it again and preserved its appearance. The restaurant is known for the famous artists who have frequented the restaurant, including Henrik Ibsen, Bjørnstjerne Bjørnson, Edvard Grieg and Edvard Munch all of whom had regular tables there.
The best known of the employees have been Crown Princess Mette-Marit, who worked as a waitress at the restaurant in the late 1990s.

Gallery

References

Other sources
 Noel Riley Fitch (2006)  The Grand Literary Cafes of Europe (New Holland Publishers (UK) Ltd, London)  
 Knut Are Tvedt (ed.): Oslo byleksikon, Kunnskapsforlaget 2010, p. 156 ,

Related reading
 Peter Rosenkrantz Johnsen: Engebreth  in "Folkebladet" (Magazine)  No. 14. 31 July 1904. pages 210-213

External links
Official website 

Buildings and structures in Oslo
Restaurants in Oslo
Restaurants established in 1848
Norwegian companies established in 1848